Mitchell District High School is a high school in Mitchell, Ontario, Canada. It is operated by the Avon Maitland District School Board. The school has approximately 500 students.

See also 
List of high schools in Ontario

References 

 Mitchell Advocate

External links 
 
Mitchell District High School

Schools in Perth County, Ontario
High schools in Ontario
Educational institutions in Canada with year of establishment missing